The 1993 AT&T Challenge was a men's tennis tournament played on outdoor clay courts in Atlanta, Georgia, United States that was part of the World Series of the 1993 ATP Tour. It was the ninth edition of the tournament and was held from April 26 through May 2, 1993. Unseeded Jacco Eltingh won the singles title.

Finals

Singles
 Jacco Eltingh defeated  Bryan Shelton, 7–6(7–1), 6–2
 It was Eltingh's 1st singles title of the year and 2nd of his career.

Doubles
 Paul Annacone /  Richey Reneberg defeated  Todd Martin /  Jared Palmer 6–4, 7–6

References

External links
 ITF tournament edition details

ATandT Challenge
Verizon Tennis Challenge
ATandT Challenge